Marconi is a lunar impact crater that is located on the Moon's far side. It lies to the northwest of the large walled plain Gagarin, and to the southwest of the prominent crater Chaplygin. To the west-northwest of Marconi is the slightly larger Dellinger.

This is a well-formed crater with only some modest impact erosion that has softened the features. The outer rim is marked only by a few tiny craterlets and some terrace structures can still be seen along the inner walls. There is a pair of small craterlets along the inner wall to the south and east. Near the midpoint of the relatively level interior floor is a low central rise composed of several small hills. The floor is otherwise marked by a number of tiny craterlets.

Previously known as 295, it was named in 1970 for Guglielmo Marconi.

Satellite craters
By convention these features are identified on lunar maps by placing the letter on the side of the crater midpoint that is closest to Marconi.

See also 
 1332 Marconia, asteroid

References

External links
 Digital Lunar Orbiter Photo Number I-115-H2

Impact craters on the Moon